Semilunar can refer to: 
 Semilunar valves
 Semilunar ganglion, or the trigeminal ganglion
 An older name for the Lunate bone
 In neurology, the semilunar fasciculus.